The Samuel D. Kilpatrick House is a historic house in Beatrice, Nebraska. It was built in 1904–05 for Samuel Davenport Kilpatrick, who lived here with his wife, née  Mary Bradt, and their adopted daughter. Kilpatrick was a railroad contractor. With his brothers, he was also a landowner in Nebraska, Kansas, South Dakota, Idaho, Oregon and Texas. The house was designed in the Renaissance Revival style by architect Richard W. Grant. It has been listed on the National Register of Historic Places since December 20, 1984.

References

		
National Register of Historic Places in Gage County, Nebraska
Renaissance Revival architecture in Nebraska
Houses completed in 1904